Fezolamine (Win-41,528-2) is a drug which was investigated by Sterling Drug as an antidepressant in the 1980s. The isomeric N,N-dimethyl-4,5-diphenyl-1H-pyrazole-1-propanamine was completely inactive in the primary antidepressant screens.

It acts as a serotonin, norepinephrine, and dopamine reuptake inhibitor, with 3- to 4-fold preference for the former neurotransmitter. It was found to be effective and well tolerated in clinical trials but was never marketed.

See also 
 3,3-Diphenylcyclobutanamine

References 

Dimethylamino compounds
Serotonin–norepinephrine reuptake inhibitors
Pyrazoles